(born June 28, 1974) is a Japanese actress.

Filmography

Film
Like a Rolling Stone (1994) - Yoko
 Zero Woman: Final Mission (1995) - Takako Fukuoka
 Cure (1997) - Tomoko Hanaoka
 Suicide Bus (1998) - Fukuda
 Keiho (1999) - Hatata Kei
 Ribbon (2021)

Television 
 Pretty Guardian Sailor Moon (2003) - Alto Seminar lecturer

References

External links
Official agency profile 
harukimisayo on Instagram

1974 births
Living people
Japanese actresses